The San Francisco State Gators are the athletic teams that compete at San Francisco State University in San Francisco, California. The nickname applies to the college's intercollegiate NCAA Division II teams. The nickname was published in the student newspaper, "The Leaf", but was long referred to in media alternatively as the "Staters" and the "Golden Gaters". The use of Gaters eventually evolved into the Gators as known today.

The Gators have had a total of 275 athletes earn All-American honors and 34 athletes earn Academic All-American honors. 14 Gators have earned an individual national title in their respective sport.

SF State competes in the California Collegiate Athletic Association while wrestling competes in the Rocky Mountain Athletic Conference. The University also offers a number of club and rec sports.

Sports sponsored

Baseball 
San Francisco State Baseball has a long history going back well into the 1930s when coached by Hal Harden and having a "record-breaking" season in 1938 according to the Berkeley Daily Gazette Maloney Field, which opened in 1984, saw extensive upgrades ahead of the 2017 season that included field work including the construction of a new pitcher's mound, new windscreens, and the installation of new foul poles. The 2018 team made the program's first-ever CCAA Championships appearance.

Basketball 
In 2016–17, the men's basketball team advanced to the NCAA Division II National Championships for the first time since the 1993–94 season. The Gators won 25 games, were ranked as high as No. 13, and finished ranked No. 22 in the nation. Junior guard Warren Jackson was named a D2 Bulletin All-American Honorable Mention.

In the late 1970s and early 80s, the women's basketball team had a string of nine straight postseason appearances.

Track and field 
In 2019, San Francisco State reopened the men's track and field program after 15 years of discontinuation.

In 2018, the San Francisco State women's track & field team captured the program's first-ever CCAA Championship. Atiya Harvey and Destiny Mack-Talalemotu were named All-Americans during the 2018 indoor season.

At the 2017 NCAA Division II Outdoor Track and Field Championships, the quartet of Atiya Harvey, Vanessa Koontz, Kennedy Hardemion, and Timarya Baynard ran a time of 3:37.80, the second fastest time in program history, and captured the National Championship in the 4x400. Additionally, Baynard finished the 400m in sixth place with a time of 54.18 to earn All-American honors. Harvey also earned individual All-American honors in the 200m dash with a fourth-place finish and time of 23.75.

At the 2017 NCAA Division II Indoor Track and Field Championships on Saturday, March 11 at the Birmingham Crossplex, the SF State 4x400 relay team garnered All-American Honors, taking sixth place  with a time of 3:44.58.

In 2014, Tiana Wills earned All-American honors in the high jump at the 2014 NCAA Division II Indoor Track and Field Championships.

The women's track and field team won back-to-back CCAA Championships in 2018 and 2019.

Wrestling 
Wrestling competes in the Rocky Mountain Athletic Conference. With the announcement of California Baptist moving to NCAA Division I, SF State becomes the only Division II wrestling program in California. The Gators wrestling program has seen success over the years, having sent a qualifier to the NCAA Division II National Championships from 1965 to 2017. In 1997, Head Coach Lars Jensen led the first-ever NCAA Division II national championship team at SF State.

Soccer 
The men's soccer team matched its best start in program history in 2017 with a 5–0 start and advanced to the postseason for the first time since 1978. The women's soccer team has been more successful reaching the NCAA postseason in recent years (2002, 2008, 2010).

Football 

San Francisco State fielded a football program from 1931 until it was discontinued in 1994. The SF State Men's Football team were Far Western Conference Champions in '51, '54, '56, '57, '58, '59, '62, '63, '65, and 1967.

Tennis
Sam Match reached the NCAA finals for San Francisco State in singles and doubles in 1949.

Championships

Appearances
The San Francisco State Gators competed in the NCAA Tournament across 11 active sports (5 men's and 6 women's) 113 times at the Division II level.

 Baseball (6): 1979,  1981,  1982,  1983,  1989,  1995
 Men's basketball (10): 1960,  1963,  1965,  1969,  1971,  1980,  1982,  1983,  1994,  2017
 Women's basketball (4): 1982,  1983,  1984,  1985 Men's cross country (1): 2012
 Men's soccer (3): 1972,  1977,  1978
 Women's soccer (3): 2002,  2008,  2010
 Softball (3): 2004,  2005,  2006,  2019
 Women's indoor track and field (7): 2001,  2011,  2012,  2013,  2014,  2017,  2018,  2019,  2020 (canceled due to COVID-19)
 Women's outdoor track and field (19): 1982,  1984,  1986,  1988,  1990,  1991,  1995,  2000,  2001,  2004,  2008,  2009,  2010,  2011,  2012,  2013,  2014,  2017,  2018,  2019
 Women's volleyball (3): 1987,  2009,  2012
 Wrestling (50): 1967,  1968,  1969,  1970,  1971,  1972,  1973,  1974,  1975,  1976,  1977,  1978,  1979,  1980,  1981,  1982,  1983,  1984,  1985,  1986,  1987,  1988,  1989,  1990,  1991,  1992,  1993,  1994,  1995,  1996,  1997,  1998,  1999,  2000,  2001,  2002,  2003,  2004,  2005,  2006,  2008,  2009,  2010,  2011,  2012,  2013,  2014,  2015,  2016,  2018,  2019,  2020 (canceled due to COVID-19)

Team

The Gators of San Francisco State earned 1 NCAA team championship at the Division II level.

 Men's (1)
Wrestling (1): 1997

Results

Below is one national club team championship:

 Women's judo (1): 1988 (NCJA)

Individual

San Francisco State had 19 Gators win NCAA individual championships at the Division II level.

Club sports

Rugby
San Francisco State has fielded a co-ed club rugby side, the Gators Rugby Football Club, founded in 2005. The Gators side hope to be accepted into the Northern California Rugby Football Union division, needing to play every weekend with a full team, receive a unanimous vote in by all coaches in the division in order to be brought in. After meeting all the requirements thus far, with a current record of 16–2 this season, the side is expecting to be inducted into the Division II NCRFU. After a long effort to achieve activation through affiliation with the university as a club sport, competing at Ocean View Park, both the men's and women's sides were able to attain affiliation by 2009. The student-run clubs compete against both university and non-university sides, including the SF Fog, St. Mary's, USF, and Santa Clara.

Sailing
In the 1980s, SFSU had a Sailing team that consisted of two Flying Junior FJ Collegiate racing boats made by Vanguard. The boats were kept on a trailer in the "Corp Yard", behind the arts building.

SFSU sailed as a member of the Pacific Coast Collegiate Sailing Conference

Sailing at SFSU was recognized as a "club sport". However the team was eligible to compete at the varsity level with other schools in the area and enjoyed strong representation from 1983 to 1988. Collegiate racing at the time had a rule that to race two boats in Varsity, one skipper had to be female. SFSU had a rotation of female skippers throughout the mid-1980s racing seasons.

SFSU participated in the "Northern Series" which included racing against UC Berkeley (CAL), California State University Maritime Academy (CMA), Stanford University, Sonoma State University, California Polytechnic State University, and UC Davis.

References

External links